Kai Michalke (born 5 April 1976) is German former professional footballer who played as a forward or left winger.

Career statistics

Honours
Germany U16
 UEFA European Under-16 Football Championship: 1992

References

External links
 
 

Living people
1976 births
Sportspeople from Bochum
German footballers
Footballers from North Rhine-Westphalia
Association football forwards
Germany under-21 international footballers
Germany youth international footballers
Bundesliga players
2. Bundesliga players
Eredivisie players
VfL Bochum players
Hertha BSC players
1. FC Nürnberg players
Alemannia Aachen players
MSV Duisburg players
Heracles Almelo players
SG Wattenscheid 09 players
German expatriate footballers
German expatriate sportspeople in the Netherlands
Expatriate footballers in the Netherlands
West German footballers